Cynthia Vanessa Vescan (born 7 February 1992) is a French freestyle wrestler of Romanian origin.

Background and wrestling career
Vescan was born in Strasbourg, France. At the 2012 Summer Olympics held in London, United Kingdom, she competed in the women's freestyle 72 kg event where she lost her first bout in the round of 16 against Moldova's Svetlana Saenko.

In 2021, she won one of the bronze medals in the 76 kg event at the Grand Prix de France Henri Deglane 2021 held in Nice, France.

Mixed martial arts career
In March 2021, news surfaced that Vescan had signed a contract with Professional Fighters League with intentions to compete in mixed martial arts in the future.

Vescan was scheduled to make her debut in mixed martial arts against Amanda Leve on August 19, 2021, at PFL 8. However, Vescan has to pull out of the bout.

References

External links

 

1992 births
Living people
Wrestlers at the 2012 Summer Olympics
Wrestlers at the 2016 Summer Olympics
French people of Romanian descent
Sportspeople from Strasbourg
Olympic wrestlers of France
French female sport wrestlers
European Wrestling Championships medalists
21st-century French women